Neodactylota liguritrix is a moth of the family Gelechiidae. It was described by Ronald W. Hodges in 1966. It is found in North America, where it has been recorded from Louisiana, Mississippi and Texas.

References

Moths described in 1966
Gelechiini